The Isotta Fraschini Tipo 8B is an Italian luxury car made between 1931 and 1934.

History
In spring 1931 the Isotta Fraschini Tipo 8A was replaced by the Tipo 8B. The U.S. price for a bare Tipo 8B chassis was nearly $10,000 (about $144,750 in 2014 dollars, or over $1000 more than a 1931 V-16 Cadillac). Unfortunately, due to the Wall Street Crash of 1929 that caused the Great Depression in the United States, there was't much of a market for such a car. The pool of wealthy Americans who had been good customers for earlier Isotta Fraschinis had dried up. Count Lodovico Mazzotti, who took over after Isotta and Fraschini left the firm in 1922, had been negotiating a manufacturing deal in 1930–1931 with Henry Ford that could have saved the company's car production; however, Benito Mussolini's National Fascist Party were in control of Italy's commerce and industry and, intent on keeping Isotta Fraschini focused on building aircraft engines for Italy's military and opposing foreign investment, prohibited all further talks with the Americans.

End of Car Production
Engineer Giustino Cattaneo, Isotta Fraschini's technical director since 1905 and the driving force behind the company becoming a world-class car manufacturer, resigned in 1933. Six months later, in the summer of 1934, the last Isotta Fraschini Tipo 8B left the assembly line. It would be 13 years before the firm would attempt to put another car, the more modern Isotta Fraschini Tipo 8C Monterosa, into production.

Even before the depression, Isotta Fraschini only constructed about 100 cars a year. There is no certainty on the number of Tipo 8Bs built; 30 are confirmed, but some sources report that 82 were produced.

Drivetrain
The pistons, the connecting rods, and the engine block of the Tipo 8B's 7.4-liter overhead valve, overhead cam, inline-eight were made of a new nickel-steel alloy. It came equipped with a three-speed manual transmission, with a four-speed Wilson pre-selective manual transmission available as an option.

Legacy
8B owners included the Aga Khan III, William Randolph Hearst, Rudolph Valentino, Gabriele d'Annunzio and Pope Pius XI. Today, only three 8Bs are known to exist. A maroon 1931 Isotta Fraschini Tipo 8B Viggo Jensen Cabriolet d'Orsay with maroon leather and ostrich skin upholstery and maroon soft top with coachwork by Dansk Karosseri-Fabrik of Copenhagen, went on to be the 1995 Pebble Beach Concours d'Elegance Best of Show winner. Featured in the 1974 Danish film "I Tyrens tegn" (Sign of the Taurus), the right-hand-drive car, which is chassis No. 869 and engine No. 821, was sold at auction to an American private collector for $1,382,500, the highest price of that sale. It is currently owned by The Keller Collection at the Pyramids in Petaluma, California.

Notes 

Tipo 8B
Cars introduced in 1931
1930s cars
Vintage vehicles